Nitya Vidyasagar (born 1983) is an American actress best known for her role as "Leela" on Sesame Street from 2008 to 2015.

Early life and education
Vidyasagar was born in Muscat, Oman to Indian Telugu parents and grew up in India at Kolkata, Hyderabad and Bangalore, before moving to the United States in 1995 at the age of 12. She attended the St. Andrew's Episcopal School in Maryland graduating in 2001. She received a BFA with Honors in Drama Tisch School of the Arts and a Minor in Music from the College of Arts and Sciences, New York University.

Career
Vidyasagar is the first Indian American cast member of Sesame Street. Leela runs a laundromat next to Mr. Hooper's Store. Sesame Street producers were not looking for an Indian American actress before they cast Vidyasagar, but the show's writers plan to use parts of Vidyasagar's background in certain episodes. Leela is described as "a young Indian American who embraces her heritage and culture".

Vidyasagar is primarily a stage actress. She trained at the Stella Adler Studio of Acting. She received praise for her performance in the drama Selling Kabul, in which she plays a central female character anxious for her brother's safety.

Filmography

Film and Television

Theatre

References

External links 
 

Living people
1983 births
People from Muscat, Oman
Indian emigrants to the United States
American film actresses
American television actresses
American stage actresses
American people of Telugu descent
American actresses of Indian descent
Tisch School of the Arts alumni
New York University alumni
21st-century American women
21st-century American actresses